Girls is a Chinese romantic-drama film directed by Wong Chun-chun and starring Ivy Chen, Fiona Sit, Yang Zishan, Shawn Yue, Wallace Chung and Vanness Wu. Originally scheduled for release on July 31, 2014, the film was moved a day earlier to July 30, 2014.

In its first week of release, Girls grossed US$16.79 million in its first five days, with 111,869 screenings and 3.25 million admissions.

Cast
 Ivy Chen
 Fiona Sit
 Yang Zishan
 Shawn Yue
 Wallace Chung
 Vanness Wu

References

External links 
 

2014 romantic comedy films
2014 films
Chinese romantic comedy-drama films
2010s Mandarin-language films